Kelime Aydın Çetinkaya (born 15 June 1982) is a Turkish cross-country skier. She became the first Turkish female athlete to compete in the Winter Olympics. She has competed in four Olympics as part of the Turkish national team, in 2002, 2006, 2010 and 2014.

Career 
Çetinkaya has competed in international competitions since 2000. In 2001, she competed as part of the Turkish junior team, and as an adult in the FIS Alpine Ski World Cup in years 2003, 2005, 2007, and 2009. She had two victories in the FIS World Cup races. Çetinkaya's best finish at the FIS Nordic World Ski Championships was 41st in the 30 km event at Sapporo in 2007. Her best World Cup finish was 46th in a sprint event in Italy in 2004.

Olympics 
In 2002, Çetinkaya became the first Turkish female athlete to take part in the Winter Olympics. Competing in three Winter Olympics, she earned her best finish of 49th in the 30 km event at Turin in the 2006.

She was the flagbearer for Turkey in the 2010 Olympics.

References

Turkey National Olympic Committee website (in Turkish)
Press and Information Office of the Turkish Government website
Turkish newspaper Milliyet (in Turkish)
 Информация на сайте Олимпиады-2010
 Информация на сайте FIS

1982 births
Living people
Sportspeople from Kars
Turkish female cross-country skiers
Turkish people of Azerbaijani descent
Olympic cross-country skiers of Turkey
Cross-country skiers at the 2002 Winter Olympics
Cross-country skiers at the 2006 Winter Olympics
Cross-country skiers at the 2010 Winter Olympics
Cross-country skiers at the 2014 Winter Olympics